Rhinogekko is a genus of geckos from Iran and Pakistan.

Species
The genus Rhinogekko contains two recognized species:
Rhinogekko femoralis  
Rhinogekko misonnei 

Nota bene: A binomial authority in parentheses indicates that the species was originally described in a genus other than Rhinogekko.

References

 
Lizard genera
Lizards of Asia
Taxa named by Gaston-François de Witte